Methuen is a surname. Notable people with the surname include:

 Sir Algernon Methuen (1856–1924), founder of Methuen & Co. Ltd.
 Anthony Methuen, 5th Baron Methuen (1891–1975), British soldier, architect and peer
 Charlotte Methuen (born 1964), British Anglican priest and historian
 John Methuen (disambiguation)
 Paul Methuen (disambiguation), various British politicians and scientists